Throughout his career, Canadian singer Justin Bieber has sold an estimated 150 million records worldwide, making him one of the best-selling music artists of all time.

In 2011, Bieber was honoured with a star in front of Avon Theater in Stratford, Ontario, Canada, where he used to busk when he was younger. On November 23, 2012, Bieber was presented with the Queen Elizabeth II Diamond Jubilee Medal by the former Prime Minister of Canada, Stephen Harper. He was one of 60,000 Canadians to receive the Diamond Jubilee medal that year. In 2013, Bieber received a Diamond award from the Recording Industry Association of America (RIAA) for his hit single "Baby", which at the time became the highest-certified digital single of all time. Bieber is credited with three Diamond Certified singles from the RIAA for "Baby", "Sorry", and "Despacito".

Bieber has won two Grammy Awards out of 23 nominations, one Latin Grammy Award, eight Juno Awards, two Brit Awards, 26 Billboard Music Awards, 20 ASCAP Awards, and numerous fan voted accolades which include 18 American Music Awards, 23 Teen Choice Awards (the most wins for a male individual), nine Nickelodeon Kids' Choice Awards (the most wins for a male musician), eight iHeartRadio Music Awards, and six MTV Video Music Awards. He has also won a record 22 MTV Europe Music Awards (the most wins for any artist) and set 33 Guinness World Records.

Honours

Academy of Country Music Awards
The Academy of Country Music Awards, also known as the ACM Awards, is a country music awards program that honours and showcases the biggest names and emerging talent in the country music industry. Bieber has received 3 nominations.

African Muzik Magazine Awards
The African Muzik Magazine Awards (commonly abbreviated as AFRIMMA) are an annual African music awards ceremony aimed to reward and celebrate musical works, talents and creativity around the African continent

American Music Awards
The American Music Awards (AMAs) is an annual ceremony that was created by Dick Clark in 1973. Bieber has received a total of 18 awards out of 26 nominations.

!
|-
!scope="row" rowspan="4"| 2010
| rowspan="3" align="center" |Himself
| align="center"| Artist of the Year
| 
| rowspan="4" align="center"|
|-
| align="center"| New Artist of the Year
| 
|-
| align="center"| Favorite Pop/Rock Male Artist
| 
|-
| align="center"| My World 2.0
| align="center"| Favorite Pop/Rock Album
| 
|-
!scope="row" | 2011
| rowspan="3" align="center" |Himself
| align="center" | Favorite Pop/Rock Male Artist
| 
| align="center"|
|-
!scope="row" rowspan="3"| 2012
| align="center" | Artist of the Year
| 
| rowspan="3" align="center"| 
|-
| align="center" | Favorite Pop/Rock Male Artist
| 
|-
| align="center" | Believe
| align="center" | Favorite Pop/Rock Album
| 
|-
!scope="row" | 2015
| align="center" | "Where Are Ü Now" (with Jack Ü)
| align="center" | Collaboration of the Year
| 
| align="center" | 
|-
!scope="row"  rowspan="5" | 2016
| rowspan="2" align="center" | Himself
| align="center" | Artist of the Year
| 
| rowspan="5" align="center" | 
|-
| align="center" | Favorite Pop/Rock Male Artist
| 
|-
| align="center" | Purpose
| align="center" | Favorite Pop/Rock Album
| 
|-
| align="center" | "Love Yourself"
| align="center" | Favorite Pop/Rock Song
| 
|-
| align="center" | "Sorry"
| align="center" | Video of the Year
| 
|-
!scope="row"  rowspan="4" | 2017
| rowspan="2" align="center" | "I'm the One" (with DJ Khaled, Quavo, Chance the Rapper, & Lil Wayne)
| align="center" | Favorite Rap/Hip-Hop Song 
| 
| rowspan="4" align="center" | 
|-
| rowspan="2" align="center" | Collaboration of the Year
| 
|-
| rowspan="2" align="center" | "Despacito" (with Luis Fonsi & Daddy Yankee)
| 
|-
| align="center" | Favorite Pop/Rock Song
| 
|-
!scope="row"  rowspan="4" | 2020
| rowspan="2" align="center"| Himself
| align="center" | Artist of the Year
| 
| rowspan="4" align="center" | 
|-
| align="center" | Favorite Pop/Rock Male Artist
| 
|-
| rowspan="2" align="center" | "10,000 Hours"  (with Dan + Shay) 
| align="center" | Collaboration of the Year
| 
|-
| align="center" | Favorite Country Song
| 
|-
!scope="row"  rowspan="2" | 2021
| align="center"| Himself
| align="center" | Favorite Pop/Rock Male Artist
| 
| rowspan="2" align="center" | 
|-
| align="center" | "Peaches" 
| align="center" rowspan="2" | Collaboration of the Year
| 
|-
!scope="row"  rowspan="2" | 2022
| align="center" rowspan="2" | "Stay" 
| 
| rowspan="2" align="center" | 
|-
| align="center" | Favourite Pop Song
| 
|}

APRA Music Awards
The APRA Music Awards is an Australian annual awards show that honors musicians who have achieved outstanding success in sales and airplay performance.

!
|-
!scope="row" rowspan="2"| 2017
| align="center" | "Love Yourself"
| align="center" rowspan="2" | International Work of the Year 
| 
| rowspan="2" align="center" | 
|-
| align="center" | "Sorry"
| 
|-
!scope="row"| 2022
| align="center" | "Stay" (with The Kid Laroi)
| align="center" | Song of the Year
| 
| align="center" | 
|}

ARIA Music Awards
The Australian Recording Industry Association Music Awards (ARIAs) were first held in 1987 in Sydney. Bieber has received three nominations.

!
|-
!scope="row"| 2016
| align="center" | Justin Bieber - Purpose 
| align="center" | Best International Artist
|
|style="text-align:center;"| 
|-
!scope="row"| 2020
| align="center" | Justin Bieber - Changes
| align="center" | Best International Artist
|
|style="text-align:center;"| 
|-
!scope="row"| 2021
| align="center" | Justin Bieber - Justice
| align="center" | Best International Artist
|
|style="text-align:center;"|

ASCAP Awards
The American Society of Composers, Authors and Publishers (ASCAP) is a not-for-profit performance rights organization that honors members of the music community in a series of annual awards shows in various music categories. Bieber has won a milestone 20 awards.

!
|-
!scope="row"| 2012
| align="center" | Justin Bieber: Never Say Never  (with Deborah Lurie)
| align="center" | Top Box Office Film
|
|style="text-align:center;"| 
|-
!scope="row"| 2013
| align="center" rowspan="2" | "As Long as You Love Me"
| align="center" rowspan="5" | Most Performed Song
|
|style="text-align:center;"| 
|-
!scope="row" rowspan="2"| 2014
|
|style="text-align:center;" rowspan="2"| 
|-
| align="center" | "Beauty And A Beat" (feat. Nicki Minaj)
|
|-
!scope="row" rowspan="2"| 2016
| align="center" | "What Do You Mean?"
| 
| style="text-align:center;" rowspan="2"| 
|-
| align="center" | "Where Are Ü Now" 
| 
|-
!scope="row" rowspan="4" | 2017
| align="center" | "Love Yourself"
| align="center" | Song of the Year
| 
| style="text-align:center;" rowspan="4" | 
|-
| align="center" | "Sorry"
| align="center" rowspan="3" | Winning Pop Song
| 
|-
| align="center" | "Cold Water" 
| 
|-
| align="center" | "Let Me Love You" 
| 
|-
!scope="row"| 2018
| align="center"| "I'm the One" 
| align="center"| Winning R&B/Hip-Hop Song
|
|style="text-align:center;"| 
|-
!scope="row" rowspan="2"| 2020
| align="center" | "I Don't Care"
| align="center"| Winning Pop Song
| 
| style="text-align:center;"| 
|-
| rowspan="2" align="center" | "10,000 Hours "
| align="center"| Winning Country Songwriter & Publisher
| 
| style="text-align:center;"| 
|-
!scope="row" rowspan="2"| 2021
| align="center" rowspan="6"| Winning Pop Songwriter & Publisher
| 
| style="text-align:center;" rowspan="2"| 
|-
| align="center" | "Intentions" 
| 
|-
!scope="row" rowspan="5"| 2022
| align="center" | "Holy"
| 
| style="text-align:center;" rowspan="4"| 
|-
| align="center" | "Lonely"
| 
|-
| align="center" | "Stay"
| 
|-
| align="center" rowspan="2" | "Peaches"
| 
|-
| align="center" | Winning R&B/Hip-Hop & Rap Song
| 
| style="text-align:center;" |

Bambi Awards
The Bambi Awards are presented annually by Hubert Burda Media to recognise excellence in international media and television "with vision and creativity who affected and inspired the German public that year, both domestic and foreign. Bieber has won an award.

!
|-
!scope="row" | 2011
| align="center" | Himself
| align="center" | Entertainment
|
|style="text-align:center;"|

BBC Radio 1 Teen's Awards
The BBC Radio 1 Teen's Awards is the event to honours the UK's unsung teenage heroes as well as the year's best music, online, sport and entertainment stars. Bieber was nominated once.

!
|-
!scope="row"| 2017
| align="center" | Himself
| align="center" | Best International Artist
|
|style="text-align:center;"|

BET Awards
The BET Awards is an American award show that was established in 2001 by the Black Entertainment Television network to celebrate African Americans in music, acting, sports and other fields of entertainment annually. Bieber has won an award out of three nominations.

!
|-
!scope="row" rowspan="2"| 2010
| align="center" rowspan="2" | Himself
| align="center" | Best New Artist
| 
| rowspan="2" align="center" rowspan="2" | 
|-
| align="center" | Fandemonium Award
| 
|-
!scope="row"| 2022
| align="center" | Essence (with Wizkid and Tems)
| align="center" | Best Collaboration
| 
| align="center"| 
|}

Billboard Awards

Billboard Japan Music Awards
The Billboard Japan Music Awards are held annually in Japan. The artists are eligible for the prize by topping one of the Billboard Japan charts. 

!
|-
!scope="row" | 2010
| align="center" | "Baby" (feat. Ludacris)
| align="center" | Hot 100 Airplay of the Year
| 
| align="center" | 
|}

Billboard Latin Music Awards
The Billboard Latin Music Awards is the Latin version of the Billboard Music Awards. Bieber has won nine awards out of 10 nominations.

!
|-
| 2016
| align="center" rowspan="4" | Himself
| align="center" rowspan="3" | Crossover Artist of the Year
| 
| align="center" | 
|-
| 2017
| 
| align="center" | 
|-
| rowspan="8"| 2018
| 
| rowspan="8" align="center" | 
|-
| align="center" | Songwriter of the Year
| 
|-
| align="center" rowspan="6" | "Despacito"(with Luis Fonsi & Daddy Yankee)
| align="center" | Hot Latin Song of the Year
| 
|-
| align="center" | Hot Latin Song of the Year — Vocal Event 
| 
|-
| align="center" | Airplay Song of the Year
| 
|-
| align="center" | Digital Song of the Year
| 
|-
| align="center" | Streaming Song of the Year
| 
|-
| align="center" | Latin Pop Song of the Year
| 
|}

Billboard Live Music Awards
Billboard honors the industry's top artists, venues and professionals of the year at the annual Billboard Live Music Awards reception. These awards are based primarily on the Billboard Boxscore chart, recognizing true box office success and industry achievement.

!
|-
!scope="row" | 2013
| align="center" | Himself
| align="center" | Eventful Fan's Choice Award
| 
| align="center" | 
|-
!scope="row" rowspan="2" | 2016
| align="center" | Purpose World Tour
| align="center" | Top Package
| 
| align="center" rowspan="2" | 
|-
| align="center" | Purpose World Tour / Calvin Klein
| align="center" | Concert Marketing & Promotion Award
| 
|}

Billboard Music Awards
The Billboard Music Awards are sponsored by Billboard magazine to honor artists and their chart performance. Bieber has won 26 awards out of 76 nominations.

!
|-
!scope="row" rowspan="12"| 2011
| align="center" rowspan="9" | Himself
| align="center" | Top Artist
| 
| rowspan="12" align="center" | 
|-
| align="center" | Top New Artist
| 
|-
| align="center" | Top Male Artist
| 
|-
| align="center" | Top Billboard 200 Artist
| 
|-
| align="center" | Top Streaming Artist
| 
|-
| align="center" | Top Social Artist
| 
|-
| align="center" | Top Digital Media Artist
| 
|-
| align="center" | Top Pop Artist
| 
|-
| align="center" | Billboard.com Fan Favorite
| 
|-
| align="center" rowspan="2" | My World 2.0
| align="center" | Top Billboard 200 Album
| 
|-
| align="center" | Top Pop Album
| 
|-
| align="center" | "Baby" (feat. Ludacris)
| align="center" | Top Streaming Song (Video)
| 
|-
!scope="row" rowspan="5"| 2012
| align="center" rowspan="4" | Himself
| align="center" | Top Male Artist
| 
| rowspan="5" align="center" | 
|-
| align="center" | Top Billboard 200 Artist
| 
|-
| align="center" | Top Social Artist
| 
|-
| align="center" | Top Digital Media Artist
| 
|-
| align="center" | Under the Mistletoe
| align="center" | Top Pop Album
| 
|-
!scope="row" rowspan="7"| 2013
| align="center" rowspan="6" | Himself
| align="center" | Top Artist
| 
| rowspan="7" align="center" | 
|-
| align="center" | Top Male Artist
| 
|-
| align="center" | Top Billboard 200 Artist
| 
|-
| align="center" | Top Social Artist
| 
|-
| align="center" | Top Pop Artist
| 
|-
| align="center" | Milestone Award
| 
|-
| align="center" | Believe
| align="center" | Top Pop Album
| 
|-
!scope="row" | 2014
| align="center" rowspan="10" | Himself
| align="center" rowspan="2" | Top Social Artist
| 
| align="center" | 
|-
!scope="row" | 2015
| 
| align="center" | 
|-
!scope="row" rowspan="12" | 2016
| align="center"| Top Artist
| 
| align="center" rowspan="12" | 
|-
| align="center"| Top Male Artist
| 
|-
| align="center" | Top Billboard 200 Artist
| 
|-
| align="center" | Top Hot 100 Artist
| 
|-
| align="center" | Top Song Sales Artist 
| 
|-
| align="center" | Top Radio Songs Artist
| 
|-
| align="center" | Top Streaming Artist
| 
|-
| align="center" | Top Social Artist
| 
|-
| align="center" | Purpose 
| align="center" | Top Billboard 200 Album
| 
|-
| align="center" | "Sorry"
| align="center" rowspan="2" | Top Streaming Song (Audio) 
| 
|-
| align="center" | "What Do You Mean?"
| 
|-
| align="center" | "Where Are Ü Now"  (with Jack Ü)
| align="center" | Top Dance/Electronic Song
| 
|-
!scope="row" rowspan="7" | 2017
| align="center" rowspan="5" | Himself
| align="center" | Top Artist
| 
| align="center" rowspan="7" | 
|-
| align="center" | Top Male Artist
| 
|-
| align="center" | Top Radio Songs Artist
| 
|-
| align="center" | Top Social Artist
| 
|-
| align="center" | Top Touring Artist
| 
|-
| align="center" | "Cold Water" 
| align="center" rowspan="2" | Top Dance/Electronic Song
| 
|-
| align="center" | "Let Me Love You" 
| 
|-
!scope="row" rowspan="8" | 2018
| align="center" | Himself
| align="center" | Top Social Artist
| 
| align="center" rowspan="8" | 
|-
| align="center" rowspan="6" | "Despacito" (with Luis Fonsi & Daddy Yankee)
| align="center" | Top Hot 100 Song
| 
|-
| align="center" | Top Streaming Song (Audio)
| 
|-
| align="center" | Top Streaming Song (Video)
| 
|-
| align="center" | Top Selling Song
| 
|-
| align="center" | Top Collaboration
| 
|-
| align="center" | Top Latin Song
| 
|-
| align="center" | "I'm the One" (with DJ Khaled, Quavo, Chance the Rapper, & Lil Wayne)
| align="center" | Top Rap Song
| 
|-
!scope="row" | 2019
| align="center" | "No Brainer" (with DJ Khaled, Quavo and Chance the Rapper)
| align="center" | Top R&B Song
| 
| align="center" | 
|-
!scope="row" rowspan="4"| 2020
| align="center" | "10,000 Hours" (with Dan + Shay)
| align="center" | Top Country Song
| 
| align="center" rowspan="4"| 
|-
| align="center" rowspan="2"| "I Don't Care" (with Ed Sheeran)
| align="center" | Top Radio Song
| 
|-
| align="center" | Top Collaboration
| 
|-
| align="center" | Changes
| align="center" | Top R&B Album
| 
|-
!scope="row" rowspan="5"| 2021
| align="center" rowspan="4"| Himself
| align="center" | Top Song Sales Artist
| 
| align="center" rowspan="5"| 
|-
| align="center" | Top Radio Songs Artist
| 
|-
| align="center" | Top R&B Artist
| 
|-
| align="center" | Top R&B Male Artist
| 
|-
| align="center" | "Intentions" 
| align="center" | Top R&B Song
| 
|-
!scope="row" rowspan="13"| 2022
| align="center" rowspan="4"| Himself
| align="center" | Top  Male Artist
|
| align="center" rowspan="13"| 
|-
| align="center" | Top Hot 100 Artist
|
|-
| align="center" | Top Radio Songs Artist
|
|-
| align="center" | Top Billboard Global 200 Artist
|
|-
| align="center" rowspan="6"| "Stay" 
| align="center" | Top Hot 100 Song
|
|-
| align="center" | Top Streaming Song
|
|-
| align="center" | Top Radio Song
|
|-
| align="center" | Top Billboard Global 200 Song
|
|-
| align="center" | Top Billboard Global (Excl. U.S.) Song
|
|-
| align="center" | Top Collaboration
|
|-
| align="center" rowspan="2" | "Peaches" 
| align="center" | Top Collaboration
|
|-
| align="center" | Top R&B Song
|
|-
| align="center" | "Essence" 
| align="center" | Top R&B Song
|
|}

Billboard.com Mid-Year Music Awards

Black Reel Awards
The Black Reel Awards began in 2000 and were designed to annually recognize and celebrate the achievements of black people in feature, independent and television films. Bieber has received a nomination.

BMI Awards

BMI Latin Awards
The BMI Latin Awards are presented annually by Broadcast Music, Inc., honoring songwriters, composers, and music publishers in the Latin genre. Bieber is credited with two awards.

BMI London Awards
The BMI London Awards are presented annually by Broadcast Music, Inc., honoring songwriters, composers, and music publishers in various genres. Bieber is credited with an award.

BMI Pop Awards
The BMI Pop Awards are presented annually by Broadcast Music, Inc., honoring songwriters, composers, and music publishers in the Pop genre. Bieber is credited with four awards.

Bravo Otto
The Bravo Otto is a German accolade honoring excellence of performers in film, television and music. The award is presented in gold, silver and bronze.

BreakTudo Awards
The BreakTudo Awards is an annual Brazilian award show that honours acts in music, film, television, and the internet. Bieber has won two awards out of 12 nominations.

Brit Awards
The Brit Awards are the British Phonographic Industry's annual pop music awards. Bieber has won two awards out of four nominations.

Canadian Fragrance Awards
The Canadian Fragrance Awards is an annual gala honouring and celebrating the year's best fragrance held by Cosmetics magazine's Canadian Fragrance & Beauty Awards.

|-
|rowspan="2"|2012
|rowspan="2"|"Someday"
|Consumers’ Choice – Women
|
|-
|Best Full Market Launch – Women's Mass
|
|}

Canadian Radio Music Awards
The Canadian Radio Music Awards are an annual series of awards presented by the Canadian Association of Broadcasters that are part of Canadian Music Week.

Circle Chart Music Awards
The Circle Chart Music Awards are presented annually in South Korea to recognise commercial performance of songs and albums based on the national music record chart Circle Music Chart.

Channel [V] Thailand Music Video Awards 
The Channel V Thailand Music Video Awards was established in 2002 by Channel [V] Thailand. The awards gives recognition and awards to Thai, International artist and Thai Music Video director.

Clio Awards
The Clio Music Awards is an annual awards show that recognises the creative contributions of the marketers and communicators that propel the music industry. Bieber has won six awards.

CMT Music Awards
The CMT Music Awards is an annual awards show honoring country music videos. Bieber won the "Collaborative Video of the Year" award in 2011.

Country Music Association Awards
The Country Music Association Awards, also known as the CMA Awards or CMAs, is an annual awards show recognizing outstanding achievement in the country music industry.

Danish Music Awards
The Danish Music Awards (DMA) is a Danish award show. Bieber has received two awards out of five nominations.

Dorian Awards
The Dorian Awards are an annual endeavor organized by the Gay and Lesbian Entertainment Critics Association (GALECA).

Do Something Awards
The Do Something Awards are hosted every year to award athletes, music artists and actors that have portrayed a social issue. Bieber has received an award.

Echo Awards
The Echo Awards were first held in 1992 Cologne. Bieber has received one nomination.

Electronic Music Awards
The Electronic Music Awards is an award show focused on the electronic music genre that debuted on September 21, 2017, in Los Angeles. Bieber has won an award out of 2 nominations.

FiFi Awards
The FiFi Awards are an annual event sponsored by The Fragrance Foundation which honor the fragrance industry's creative achievements and is the most prominent and prestigious celebratory event of the fragrance industry.

UK Fifi Awards
The UK FiFi Awards are an annual event sponsored by The Fragrance Foundation which honor the fragrance industry's creative achievements and is the most prominent and prestigious celebratory event of the fragrance industry in UK.

GAFFA Awards

GAFFA Awards (Denmark)

Georgia Music Hall of Fame
The Georgia Music Hall of Fame was located in downtown Macon, Georgia, United States, from 1996 until it closed in 2011. Bieber was honored in 2011.

Global Awards
The Global Awards are held by Global Media & Entertainment and reward music played on the British radio stations. Bieber has won an award out of five nominations.

Grammy Awards
The Grammy Awards are awarded by the National Academy of Recording Arts and Sciences. They honor artistic achievement, technical proficiency and overall excellence in the recording industry, without regard to album sales or chart position. Bieber has won two awards out of 23 nominations.

Guinness World Records
The Guinness World Records honors the year's most impressive acts. Bieber has set 33 records.

Hungarian Music Awards
The Hungarian Music Awards have been given to artists in the field of Hungarian music since 1992.

iHeartRadio Awards

iHeartRadio Much Music Video Awards

The iHeartRadio Much Music Video Awards (also known as the MMVAs) were an annual award show presented by the Canadian music video channel MuchMusic to honor the year's best music videos. Bieber has won 12 awards out of 21 nominations.

|-
|rowspan="4"| 2010
|"One Time"
|International Video of the Year by a Canadian
|
|-
|rowspan="2"|"Baby"  (feat. Ludacris)
|International Video of the Year by a Canadian
|
|-
|Your Fave: Video
|
|-
|rowspan="2"|Justin Bieber
|Your Fave: New Artist
|
|-
|rowspan="3"|2011
|Your Fave: Artist
|
|-
|rowspan="2"|"Somebody to Love"  (feat. Usher)
|International Video of the Year by a Canadian
|
|-
|MuchMUSIC.COM Most Watched Video
|
|-
|rowspan="3"|2012
|"Next to You" (with Chris Brown)
|International Video of the Year - Artist
|
|-
|"Boyfriend"
|International Video of the Year by a Canadian
|
|-
|rowspan="2"|Justin Bieber
|Your Fave: Artist or Group
|
|-
|rowspan="2"|2013
|Your Fave: Artist or Group
|
|-
|"As Long as You Love Me"  (feat. Big Sean)
|International Video of the Year by a Canadian
|
|-
|rowspan="2"|2014
|"All That Matters"
|International Video of the Year by a Canadian
|
|-
|rowspan="4"|Justin Bieber
|Your Fave: Artist or Group
|
|-
|rowspan="2"|2015
|Fan Fave Artist or Group
|
|-
|Most Buzzworthy Canadian
|
|-
|rowspan="3"|2016
|Most Buzzworthy Canadian
|
|-
|"Sorry"
|Canadian Single of the Year
|
|-
|rowspan=3|Justin Bieber
|Fan Fave Artist or Group
|
|-
|rowspan=2|2017
|Most Buzzworthy Canadian
|
|-
|Fan Fave Artist or Group
|
|}

iHeartRadio Music Awards

The iHeartRadio Music Awards is an international music awards show founded by iHeartRadio in 2014. Bieber has won eight awards from 41 nominations.

iHeartRadio Titanium Award

International Dance Music Awards
The International Dance Music Awards are held annually as part of the Winter Music Conference. Bieber won an award out of 4 nominations.

JIM Awards
The JIM Awards are an annual awards show presented by the Flemish TV channel JIM. Bieber has won an award out of three nominations.

Joox Awards

Joox Thailand Music Awards
The Joox Thailand Music Awards (abbreviated as JTMA) is an annual music awards presented by Joox music streaming application.

Joox Top Music Awards Malaysia

Joox Top Music Awards Malaysia (Mid Year)

Juno Awards
The Juno Awards, more popularly known as the JUNOS, are presented annually to Canadian musical artists and bands to acknowledge their artistic and technical achievements in all aspects of music. Bieber has won 8 awards out of 32 nominations.

Kerrang! Awards
The Kerrang! Awards is an annual music awards show in the United Kingdom, founded by the music magazine, "Kerrang!.

Latin American Music Awards
The Latin American Music Awards (Latin AMAs) is an annual American music award to be presented by Telemundo. Bieber has won two awards out of seven nominations.

Latin Grammy Awards
The Latin Grammy is an award by The Latin Recording Academy to recognize outstanding achievement in the Latin music industry. The Latin Grammy honors works produced anywhere around the world that were recorded in either Spanish or Portuguese and is awarded in the United States.

Lunas del Auditorio 
The Lunas del Auditorio are sponsored by The National Auditorium in Mexico to honor the best live shows in the country. Bieber has received three nominations.

LOS40 Music Awards
The LOS40 Music Awards, formerly known as Premios 40 Principales, are annual awards organized by Spanish music radio Los 40. Bieber has received 3 awards from 9 nominations.

NME Awards
The NME Awards is an annual music awards show in the United Kingdom, founded by the music magazine, NME (New Musical Express). Bieber has won 4 awards out of 7 nominations.

!
|-
|rowspan="3"|2011
|My World 2.0
|Worst Album
|
|rowspan="3"|
|-
|rowspan="3"|Justin Bieber
|Least Stylish
|
|-
|Villain of the Year 
|
|-
|rowspan="2"|2012
|Villain of the Year
|
|rowspan="2"|
|-
|Under the Mistletoe
|Worst Album
|
|-
|2013
|Justin Bieber
|Worst Band
|
|
|-
|2022
|"Stay  (with The Kid Laroi 
|Best Song in the World
|
|
|}

NRJ Music Awards
The NRJ Music Awards, (commonly abbreviated as an NMA) is an award presented by the French radio station NRJ to honour the best in home and worldwide music industry. Bieber has won 6 from 13 nominations.

O Music Awards
The O Music Awards (commonly abbreviated as the OMAs) is an awards show presented by Viacom to honor music, technology and intersection between the two. Bieber has received 6 nominations.

People's Choice Awards
The People's Choice Awards (PCAs) is an awards show recognizing the people and the work of popular culture. Bieber has won three awards out of 29 nominations.

Official Charts
The Official Charts Company (also known as the Official Charts), is a British inter-professional organisation that compiles various "official" record charts in a number of European territories. It also honors artists in achieving the pinnacle of UK Singles Chart success. Bieber was the first recipient of the Official Chart Record Breaker Award.

PETA Libby Awards

Pollstar Awards
The Pollstar Awards is an annual award ceremony to honor artists and professionals in the concert industry. Bieber has received six nominations.

Popstar! Poptastic Awards 
The Popstar! Poptastic Awards is an annual award to honor artists in the entertainment industry held by Popstar! magazine.

Premios Juventud
The Premios Juventud (Youth Awards) is an awards show for Spanish-speaking celebrities in the areas of film, music, sports, fashion, and pop culture.

Premios Oye!
The Premios Oye! (Premio Nacional a la Música Grabada) were presented annually by the Academia Nacional de la Música en México for outstanding achievements in the Mexican record industry.

Radio Disney Music Awards
The Radio Disney Music Awards (RDMA) is an annual awards show which is operated and governed by Radio Disney, an American radio network. Bieber has won 6 awards out of 16 nominations.

Rockbjörnen
The Rockbjörnen is a music prize in Sweden, divided into several categories, which is awarded annually by the newspaper Aftonbladet. The prize was first awarded in 1979, and is mostly centered on pop and rock. Bieber has received 3 nominations.

Shorty Awards
The Shorty Awards, also known as the Shorties, are an annual awards event that honors the best short-form content creators on the micro-blogging website Twitter and on other social media sites. Bieber has received three awards out of 15 nominations.

Social Star Awards 
The Social Star Awards is an annual awards show that honors the year's biggest achievements held in Singapore.

Spotify Plaques 
The Spotify Plaques are awarded to artists to recognize songs that exceed 1 billion streams on the platform. Bieber has received a record 13 plaques.

Streamy Awards 
The Streamy Awards, also known as the YouTube Streamy Awards, are presented annually to recognize and honor excellence in online video, including directing, acting, producing, and writing.

Teen Choice Awards
The Teen Choice Awards is an annual awards show that honors the year's biggest achievements in music, movies, sports, television, fashion, and more. Bieber has won 23 out of 56 nominations.

Telehit Awards
The Telehit Awards are annual award show. Bieber has won five awards out of 12 nominations.

RIAA Gold & Platinum Program 
The Recording Industry Association of America's (RIAA) Gold & Platinum Program defines success in the recorded music industry honor artists and track sound recording sales.

Tribeca Disruptive Innovation Awards
The Tribeca Disruptive Innovation Awards (TDIA) celebrates those whose ideas have broken the mold to create significant impact.

Variety's Power of Youth Awards
The Variety's Power of Youth GenerationOn Award recognizes young stars who have made significant contributions to philanthropic or charitable causes.

Virgin Media Music Awards
The Virgin Media Music Awards are the annual music awards run by Virgin Media. The winners are declared on its official site "Virgin Media".

WDM Radio Awards
The WDM Radio Awards are dance and electronic music awards established in 2017 by Los 40 under their World Dance Music brand.

Webby Awards
A Webby Award is an award for excellence on the Internet presented annually by The International Academy of Digital Arts and Sciences. Categories include websites, interactive advertising, online film and video, and mobile.

We Love Pop Awards 
The We Love Pop Magazine Awards is an accolade in music, TV, fashion and movies voted by fans and held by British magazine, We Love Pop.

Wembley Way Walk of Fame
The Wembley Way Walk of Fame honors acts for their defining performances and/or moments at the Wembley Stadium, UK. Inductees are presented with a stone plaque that is laid on the Wembley Way.

World Leadership Awards
The World Leadership Awards have been prepared by the World Leadership Forum of England, UK.

World Music Awards
The World Music Awards is an international awards show founded in 1989 that annually honored recording artists based on worldwide sales figures provided by the International Federation of the Phonographic Industry (IFPI).

Young Hollywood Awards
The Young Hollywood Awards is an award show presented annually which honors the year's biggest achievements in music, movies, sports, television, fashion and more. In 2010, Bieber won the "Newcomer of the Year" award and the "Champ of Charity Award" in 2014.

Youth Rock Awards 
The Youth Rock Awards is an awards show recognizing the people and the work in entertainment industry.
{| class="wikitable" style="width:70%;"
|-
! width=5%|Year
! style="width:40%;" | Recipient
! style="width:45%;"| Award
! style="width:10%;"| Result
|-
| rowspan="3"|2011
|Justin Bieber
|Rockin' Artist of the Year
|
|-
|"U Smile"
|rowspan="2"|Rockin' Music Video of the Year
|
|-
|"Next to You" (with Chris Brown)
|

YouTube Music Awards
The YouTube Music Awards (commonly abbreviated as YTMA) is an awards show presented by YouTube to honor the best in the music video medium. Bieber has received 2 nominations.

Notes

References

Awards
Bieber, Justin